is a Japanese voice actress that is best known for performing narration and character voices in popular fighting games for SNK. She is the standard voice for the characters Blue Mary, King, Charlotte, and Nakoruru who appear in the popular franchises of video games The King of Fighters, Fatal Fury, Art of Fighting and Samurai Shodown. She is sometimes called by SNK to perform character image songs at SNK's special events. She is affiliated with J Productions.

Roles

Anime
Jubei-chan: The Ninja Girl series – Shokou Maruyama
Kodocha – Fuka Matsui
Monkey Typhoon – Milk
Nakoruru: Ano Hito kara no Okurimono – Nakoruru
Ojarumaru  – Sakata Kintaro, Tamura Sayuri, Francious, Damoru Tomeo
Samurai Spirits 2: Asura Zanmaeden – Nakoruru
Super Mario Fire Brigade – Tatsuya
The King of Fighters: Destiny – King
Yume no Crayon Okuni – Moon Child, Kinta, Pitt

Video games
Art of Fighting (1992) – King, Yuri Sakazaki
Samurai Shodown (1993) – Nakoruru, Charlotte Christine de Colde
Art of Fighting 2 (1994) – King
The King of Fighters '94 (1994) – King
Samurai Shodown II (1994) – Nakoruru, Charlotte Christine de Colde, Mizuki Rashojin
Fatal Fury 3: Road to the Final Victory (1995) – Blue Mary
The King of Fighters '95 (1995) – King
Samurai Shodown III (1995) – Nakoruru
Real Bout Fatal Fury (1995) – Blue Mary
Art of Fighting 3: The Path of the Warrior (1996) – Sinclair
The King of Fighters '96 (1996) – King, Narrator
Samurai Shodown IV (1996) – Nakoruru, Charlotte Christine de Colde
Real Bout Fatal Fury Special (1997) – Blue Mary
The King of Fighters '97 (1997) – Blue Mary, King
Samurai Shodown 64 (1997) – Nakoruru
Real Bout Fatal Fury 2: The Newcomers (1998) – Blue Mary
The King of Fighters '98 (1998) – Blue Mary, King, Narrator
Samurai Shodown 64: Warriors Rage (1998) – NakoruruThe Last Blade 2 (1998) – Kotetsu NaoeThe King of Fighters '99 (1999) – Blue Mary, KingSamurai Shodown: Warriors Rage (1999) – NakoruruThe King of Fighters 2000 (2000) – Blue Mary, KingCapcom vs. SNK: Millennium Fight 2000 (2000) – KingCapcom vs. SNK 2: Millionaire Fighting 2001 (2001) – KingThe King of Fighters 2001 (2001) – Blue Mary, KingThe King of Fighters 2002 (2002) – Blue Mary, KingSamurai Shodown V (2003) – Nakoruru, Charlotte Christine de ColdeThe King of Fighters 2003 (2003) – Blue Mary, KingSamurai Shodown V Special (2004) – Nakoruru, Charlotte Christine de ColdeThe King of Fighters Neowave (2004) – Blue Mary, KingNeoGeo Battle Coliseum (2005) – NakoruruSamurai Shodown VI (2005) – Charlotte Christine de Colde, Mizuki RashojinThe King of Fighters XI (2005) – Blue Mary, King, NarratorThe King of Fighters XIII (2010) – KingThe King of Fighters XIV (2016) – KingThe King of Fighters All Star (2018) – KingThe King of Fighters XV (2022) – King

Radio
Neo Chubi 
Yamamoto Mari Falling no Shall We Fall in Love?
Happy Boy! Drama

DubbingStressed Eric'' – Mrs. Perfect

References

1970 births
Voice actresses from Osaka
Japanese video game actresses
Japanese voice actresses
Living people
20th-century Japanese actresses
21st-century Japanese actresses